Francis Harry Mobley (May 14, 1870 – February 3, 1920) was a political figure in British Columbia. He represented Atlin from 1916 to 1920 in the Legislative Assembly of British Columbia as a Liberal.

He died in office of influenza at the age of 50 at the Empress Hotel in Victoria in 1920.

References

External links

1870 births
1920 deaths
British Columbia Liberal Party MLAs